Ursa Creek is a stream in northwest Adams County, Illinois and is a tributary of the Mississippi River. It continues to the west to enter the Mississippi floodplain at  where it is channelized as the Rock and Ursa Creek Diversion Channel to enter the Mississippi across from La Grange, Missouri.

References

Rivers of Adams County, Illinois
Rivers of Illinois